Cochleanthes flabelliformis is a species of orchid and the type species of the genus Cochleanthes.

References

External links

flabelliformis
Orchids of Central America
Orchids of Belize